The 2003–04 ISU Junior Grand Prix was the seventh season of the ISU Junior Grand Prix, a series of international junior level competitions organized by the International Skating Union. It was the junior-level complement to the Grand Prix of Figure Skating, which was for senior-level skaters. Skaters competed in the disciplines of men's singles, ladies' singles, pair skating, and ice dance. The top skaters from the series met at the Junior Grand Prix Final.

Competitions
The locations of the JGP events change yearly. In the 2003–04 season, the series was composed of the following events:

Junior Grand Prix Final qualifiers
The following skaters qualified for the 2003–04 Junior Grand Prix Final, in order of qualification.

Lina Johansson of Sweden was the second qualifier in the ladies' event, and so Sweden did not have a host wildcard entry to the Junior Grand Prix Final.

Medalists

Men

Ladies

Pairs

Ice dance

Medals table

References

External links
 
 
 
 Junior Grand Prix, Czech Republic at the International Skating Union
 
 Junior Grand Prix, Japan at the International Skating Union
 
 Junior Grand Prix, Poland at the International Skating Union
 
 2003–04 Results
 Junior Grand Prix, Japan official site

ISU Junior Grand Prix
2003 in figure skating
2003 in youth sport
2004 in youth sport